Baal is a Semitic term for "Lord" or "owner".

Baal may also refer to:

Religion
 Baal (demon), a Christian demon, loosely identified with the Canaanite god
 Baal Peor, a Canaanite deity
 Baal-berith, worshiped in ancient Canaan
 Baal-zebub or Beelzebub, a demon in some Abrahamic religions
 Hadad, a Canaanite deity commonly known as Baal or Ba'lu

Places
 Baal, Germany, a village in the municipality of Hückelhoven
 Baal, Belgium, a village in the municipality of Tremelo
 Baal, Netherlands, a hamlet in the Dutch province Gelderland

People
 Baal I, 7th-century BC king of Tyre
 Baal Shem Tov (1698–1760), Jewish mystical rabbi
 Baal HaTanya (1745–1812), Orthodox Rabbi
 Baal Müller (born 1969), German writer and publisher
 Adam Muraszko (stage name Baal), Czech/Polish heavy metal musician
 Georges Baal (1938–2013), Hungarian writer
 Johann Baal (1657–1701), German composer
 Karin Baal (born 1940), German film actress
 Loïc Baal (born 1992), French footballer
 Ludovic Baal (born 1986), French Guianese footballer

Arts and entertainment

Characters and fictional entities
 Baal (comics), a Marvel Comics character
 Bhaal (Forgotten Realms), a fictional deity in the Dungeons & Dragons: Forgotten Realms novels and games
 Ba'al (Stargate), a fictional character in Stargate SG-1
 Ba'al, a character in Vampireology: The True History of the Fallen
 General Baal, a character of the video game Grandia
 Baal, a character in the Diablo series
 Baal, a character in the Disgaea series of games
 A fictional planet in the Warhammer 40,000 series
 Ba'al, a character in the video game Genshin Impact

Music
 Baal (band), a Danish rock band
 BAAL (Serbian band), a Serbian gothic rock band
 Baal (EP), a 1981 EP by David Bowie, featuring incidental music written for Brecht's play
 Baal: Book of Angels Volume 15, a 2010 album by the Ben Goldberg Quartet composed by John Zorn
 "Baäl", a song by Exuma from his 1970 album Exuma II

Other uses in arts and entertainment
 Baal (film), a 1970 German TV film, directed by Volker Schlöndorff and based on the play
 Baal (play), a 1918 play by Bertolt Brecht
 Baal (video game), a 1988 computer game for the Amiga
 Baal, a 1978 horror novel by Robert McCammon

Other uses
 British Association for Applied Linguistics, a UK society for applied linguists
 Baal teshuva movement, worldwide movement among the Jewish people

See also
 
 
 Baalah (disambiguation)
 Bael (disambiguation)
 Ball (disambiguation)
 Bail (disambiguation)
 Bale (disambiguation)
 Belus (disambiguation)